The Chicagoblok (Also known as the Europark) is a block of flats in the district of Linkeroever, Antwerp.

References

Skyscrapers in Belgium
Houses in Belgium
Buildings and structures in Antwerp
Residential skyscrapers